Kuchinapally is a hamlet under Ipur village and mandal, Guntur district, Andhra Pradesh, India.

References

Villages in Guntur district